The intermediate station Banderas is part of the TransMilenio mass-transit system of Bogotá, Colombia, which opened in the year 2000.

Location
The station is located in southwestern Bogotá, specifically on Avenida de Las Américas with Carrera 75 and 78H, near the Monumento a las Banderas (Monument to the Flags).

Origin of the name 

The station receives its name from the Monument to the Flags (In Spanish, Monumento a las Banderas), built in 1948.

History 

In the year 2003 the Transmilenio trunk of the Americas was inaugurated from the station Americas Carrera 53 A (nowadays known as Distrito Grafiti), until the station Transversal 86 (TransMilenio), which includes the Banderas station. When it was first opened, this station had no feeding services, however, by early 2004, these were implemented.

This station has a large cycloparqueadero (an infrastructure designed to park bicycles), being also the first station of the system that counted on this service.

It is one of the most known stations of the system and, due to its large size, it has a portal-like appearance (portals are the name of most terminus stations in the Transmilenio system). The design of the central part of the station was replicated in stations of other systems of massive transport like the Metrobús of Mexico City.

It has two pedestrian bridges: one through which the station is accessed by, and an internalone that allows passengers to walk from the central part of the station (in the center of the Avenue), to the covered bays, where the feeding services are found. This design constitutes the new standard for the future intermediate stations of the system.

Station services

Old trunk services

Main line service

Feeding services 

The following feeder routes also work:

South Platform (Kennedy Zone)
  Route 8.1 Back and forth to the central Kennedy Sector.
  Route 8.2 to the Kennedy Hospital sector.
  Route 8.4 Back and forth to the Corabastos sector .
  Route 8.6 to the Timiza neighborhood.
North Platform (Zona Tintal - Zona Franca)
  Route 8.3 Back and forth to the Castilla neighborhood.
  Route 8.5 Back and forth to the sector of the Tintal public library.

Inter-city service

This station does not have inter-city bus service.

See also
Bogotá
TransMilenio
List of TransMilenio Stations

External links

TransMilenio

TransMilenio